This is a list of current and former county courthouses in the U.S. state of New Mexico. Many of the buildings are listed on the National Register of Historic Places or other listings of historic places, as noted.

New Mexico's original nine counties were established in 1852, shortly after the organization of New Mexico Territory. The earliest county courthouses were generally small one- or two-story adobe buildings, often re-purposed homes or commercial buildings. Some counties did not even have a formal courthouse, with the district court (which was only in session a few days a year) renting rooms when necessary to conduct its business. A handful of early courthouses are still standing, including notable examples in Cimarron, Lincoln, and Mesilla.

New Mexico's public buildings began to grow in scale and ambition in the 1880s, spurred by the arrival of the railroad. With skilled workers, modern building materials, and more advanced construction techniques now available, larger and grander county courthouses emulating those in the eastern states were seen as points of civic pride. During the 1880s and 1890s, large brick or stone courthouses, many with elaborate Victorian architecture, were built in 13 counties. The only one of these still standing in its original form is the Old Colfax County Courthouse in Springer, though a few others exist in ruins.

The next wave of courthouse construction occurred between 1934 and 1942, when President Franklin D. Roosevelt's New Deal programs made large amounts of federal funding available for public works projects. Thirteen counties took advantage of New Deal programs to replace their aging railroad-era courthouses, and the Eddy County Courthouse was remodeled. Courthouses from this period often featured Art Deco or Pueblo style architecture, and the majority of them remain in use.

Historically, the county courthouse housed all the administrative and judicial functions of the county government. As county governments have expanded with growing populations, many counties now have much more decentralized facilities. This list includes only buildings currently or formerly used by the New Mexico District Court.

KEY

Courthouses with multiple historic designations are colored according to their highest designation within the following hierarchy.

Current

†As of 2017, the new Mora County facility is partially completed but construction is on hold due to funding problems.

Former

References

 County
New Mexico
Courthouses, county